This is a List of Notable Old Geelong Grammarians, they being notable former students - known as "Old Geelong Grammarians" of the Anglican Church school, Geelong Grammar School and old girls of The Hermitage and Clyde School in Geelong, Victoria, Australia.

In 2001, The Sun-Herald ranked Geelong Grammar School fourth in Australia's top ten schools for boys, based on the number of its male alumni mentioned in the Who's Who in Australia (a listing of notable Australians).

Academia

Business

Clergy 
 Bishop Thomas Armstrong, Bishop of Wangaratta (1902–1927)
 Bishop Reginald Stephen, Bishop of Tasmania (1914–1919) and Bishop of Newcastle (1919–1928)
 Bishop Jack Stretch, Bishop of Newcastle (1906–1919)

Media, entertainment and the arts

Medicine

Military

Politics

Public service and the law

Royalty

Science 
 John Gordon Rushbrooke, particle physicist

Sport

See also
 List of schools in Victoria
 List of boarding schools
Associated Public Schools of Victoria

References

External links 
 Geelong Grammar School website

Lists of people educated in Victoria (Australia) by school affiliation
Associated Public Schools of Victoria
Geelong-related lists
 
 List